Transgender rights in the United Kingdom have varied significantly over time, with the British transgender community facing ongoing challenges not experienced by cisgender Britons. These include various laws and public attitudes in regards to identity documents, as well as anti-discrimination measures used by or pertaining to transgender people, in the areas of employment, education, housing and social services, amongst others.

Trans people have been able to change their passports and driving licences to indicate their preferred binary gender since at least 1970. Transgender people were, prior to the ruling in Corbett v Corbett, able to have their birth certificate informally amended to reflect their gender identity. The ruling prevented the amendment of the sex marker on birth certificates for other than clerical errors. The 2002 Goodwin v United Kingdom ruling by the European Court of Human Rights resulted in parliament passing the Gender Recognition Act of 2004 to allow people to apply to change their legal gender, through application to a tribunal called the Gender Recognition Panel. The application requires the submission of medical evidence and a statutory declaration. The tribunal is made up of medical and legal members appointed by the Lord Chancellor.

Anti-discrimination measures protecting transgender people have existed in the UK since 1999, and were strengthened in the 2000s to include anti-harassment wording. Later in 2010, gender reassignment was included as a protected characteristic in the Equality Act. With the 2013 introduction of same-sex marriage, it became possible for a spouse to legally change their gender without requiring a divorce in the UK, with the exception of Northern Ireland, where this became an option nearly a decade later on 13 January 2020.

Medical classification
In December 2002, the Lord Chancellor's office published the Government Policy Concerning Transsexual People document that categorically states that transsexualism "is not a mental illness", but rather a "widely recognised medical condition" characterised by an "overpowering sense of different gender identity".

Medical treatment for minors 

In December 2020, the High Court ruled that children under 16 could not consent to puberty blockers, with NHS England consequently stating that any requirement for puberty blockers would have to be brought through a court order before treatment. , it had not been made clear how a court order could be brought in order for a minor to access puberty blockers, and no court orders had yet been issued, with waiting lists for hormone treatment for adults on the NHS heavily exceeding targets of 18 weeks to first appointment.

In April 2022, Secretary of State for Health and Social Care Sajid Javid announced an inquiry into gender treatment for children, following concerns raised in the interim report of the Cass Review.

In June 2022, The Times reported Javid announcing a proposed change in UK medical privacy law, allowing the state to gain access to and scrutinise the medical records of all minors treated for gender dysphoria within the preceding decade, estimated at 9000 people. The Times reported Javid having "likened political sensitivities over gender dysphoria to officials' fear of being labelled racist if they investigated abuse by men of Pakistani heritage in Rotherham".

In July 2022, it was announced that the NHS would close its only youth gender identity clinic, with the intent of transitioning to a more regional system of care access.

Proposed reform 

NHS draft guidance obtained by Reuters indicates that, in response to a three year wait time for access to gender affirming care causing people to seek private-sector or unprescribed solutions, the NHS is considering banning private care providers from prescribing gender affirming care, and mandating that the authorities be notified if a patient is found to be using unprescribed hormone medication. If a trans patient is found to be accessing any of these resources, they will be barred from receiving gender affirming healthcare with the NHS. Furthermore under the guidance, if an NHS doctor determines a patient shouldn't be allowed access to gender affirming hormone therapy, they can advise the patient's primary care provider to initiate "safeguarding protocols". The draft guidance also included significant restrictions on social transition (such as changing one's pronouns and clothing), declaring it an active intervention with potential harms, and only authorizing it in cases of "clinically significant distress or significant impairment of social functioning". The reported justification for this was the NHS’s stated belief that health providers should be "mindful that this may be a transient phase, particularly for prepubertal children, and that there will be a range of pathways to support these children and young people and a range of outcomes." The proposed policy has been compared by some to conversion therapy.

The draft guidance's Equality and Health Inequalities Impact Assessment addressed potential concerns of discrimination based on the legally protected characteristic of "gender reassignment" by stating not all of the patients impacted by the proposal will be allowed to access such care by the NHS, and thus "To apply such a definition to these individuals is to make assumptions upon the aims and intentions of those referred, the certainty of those desires and their outward manifestation, and upon the appropriate treatment that may be offered and accepted in due course".

WPATH response 

In November 2022, the World Professional Association of Transgender Health published a statement in which it described the methodology of treatment suggested in the proposed reforms as "tantamount to 'conversion' or 'reparative' therapy", and that the psychotherapy route of treatment recommended "seems to view gender incongruence largely as a mental health disorder or a state of confusion and withholds gender-affirming treatments on this basis". The statement further says that the proposal "makes assumptions about transgender children and adolescents which are outdated and untrue", and that it "quotes selectively and ignores newer evidence about the persistence of gender incongruence in children". It also describes the requirement to obtain medical approval to change one's clothing or pronouns as "an unconscionable degree of medical and state intrusion", and that the proposal document "makes unsupported statements about the influence of family, social, and mental health factors on the formation of gender identity".

Sports

In September 2021, the UK Sports Council Equality Group issued new guidance saying that in their view, trans inclusion and "competitive fairness" cannot coexist in sports. The SCEG based its guidance on 300 interviews regarding personal opinions on the matter, conducted across 54 sports and 175 organisations, with only 20 of those interviewed being trans people.

In June 2022, conservative UK culture secretary Nadine Dorries met with the heads of UK sporting bodies and told them that "elite and competitive women's sport must be reserved for people born of the female sex".

In July 2022, the British Triathlon issued a blanket policy banning any athletes not assigned female at birth above the age of 12 from competing, instead requiring them to compete in a newly announced "open" category. This was a reversal of an earlier 2018 policy which allowed for trans inclusion once certain hormonal prerequisites had been met.

British Triathlon Chief Executive Andy Salmon was reported as stating that he wasn't "aware" of any elite-level trans athletes competing in triathlons in Britain, but didn't want the governing body to wait for "that to be a problem" before it "tried to fix it".

Later that same month, both the Rugby Football League and the Rugby Football Union implemented similar bans. Both organisations described this as "a precautionary approach".

Transgender prisoners' rights

In August 2022, a statement was issued by the Ministry of Justice under Dominic Raab, that trans prisoners would be sent to prisons based on their genitalia.

Hate Crimes

The Office for National Statistics has stated that it is not possible to conclusively identify transgender victims in current homicide statistics because the gender of the homicide victim is determined by the police force that records the crime, however between 2017 and 2018, the Home Office recorded 545 violent hate crimes against trans people.

Research from the LGBT charity Stonewall has found that during that same period, 19% of trans people in the UK were victims of domestic abuse, compared to 7.9% of cis women and 4.2% of cis men.

Gender recognition

The Gender Recognition Act 2004 was drafted in response to court rulings from the European Court of Human Rights. On 11 July 2002, in Goodwin & I v United Kingdom, ( Christine Goodwin & I v United Kingdom [2002] 2 FCR 577), the European Court of Human Rights ruled that rights to privacy and family life were being infringed and that "the UK Government had discriminated based on the following: Violation of Article 8 and Article 12 of the European Convention on Human Rights". Following this judgment, the UK government had to introduce new legislation to comply. In response to its obligation, the UK Parliament passed the Gender Recognition Act 2004, which effectively granted full legal recognition for binary transgender people.

Since 4 April 2005, as per the Gender Recognition Act 2004, it is possible for transgender people to change their legal gender in the UK. Transgender people must present evidence to a Gender Recognition Panel, which considers their case and issues a Gender Recognition Certificate (GRC); they must have transitioned two years before a GRC is issued. It is not a requirement for sex reassignment surgery to have taken place. However, such surgery will be accepted as part of the supporting evidence for a case where it has taken place. There is formal approval of medical gender reassignment available either on the National Health Service (NHS) or privately. If the person's birth or adoption was registered in the United Kingdom, they may also be issued a new birth certificate after their details have been entered onto the Gender Recognition Register.

In June 2020, a report published by the European Commission ranked the procedure established in the Gender Recognition Act 2004 as amongst the worst in Europe with "intrusive medical requirements", which means it now lags behind international human rights standards.

In September 2020, the UK government published the results of a public consultation into reform of the Gender Recognition Act 2004 which had been launched in 2018. This showed majority support for wide-ranging changes, however the UK Government decided not to change the current law.

Cost 
In April 2021, it was reported that the fee for a Gender Recognition Certificate would be reduced from £140 to £5 in early May 2021. People applying for a GRC still require additional documents that separately increase the cost of applying for a GRC to far more than this £5 fee, leaving many still financially unable to apply for the certificate.

Legal recognition of non-binary identities

The title "Mx." is widely accepted in the United Kingdom by government organisations and businesses as an alternative for non-binary people, while the Higher Education Statistics Agency allows the use of non-binary gender markers for students in higher education. In 2015, early day motion EDM660 was registered with Parliament, calling for citizens to be permitted access to the 'X' marker on passports. In 2016, a formal petition through the Parliamentary Petitions Service calling for EDM660 to be passed into law gained only 2,500 signatures before closing.

In September 2015, the Ministry of Justice responded to a petition calling for self-determination of legal gender, stating that they were not aware of "any specific detriment" experienced by non-binary people unable to have their genders legally recognised. In January 2016, the Trans Inquiry Report by the Women and Equalities Committee called for protection from discrimination of non-binary people under the Equality Act, for the 'X' gender marker to be added to passports, and for a wholesale review into the needs of non-binary people by the government within six months.

In May 2021, the Government rejected a petition to legally recognise non-binary identities, claiming there would be "complex practical consequences" for such a move. The petition has passed the threshold of 100,000 signatures to be considered for a debate in Parliament, but  this debate had not yet been scheduled.

Discrimination protections
The Sex Discrimination Act 1975 made it illegal to discriminate on the ground of anatomical sex in employment, education, and the provision of housing, goods, facilities and services. The Sex Discrimination (Gender Reassignment) Regulations 1999 extended the existing Sex Discrimination Act, and made it illegal to discriminate against any person on the grounds of gender reassignment, but only in the areas of employment and vocational training.

The Equality Act 2006 introduced the Gender Equality Duty in Scotland, which made public bodies obliged to take seriously the threat of harassment or discrimination of transsexual people in various situations. In 2008, the Sex Discrimination (Amendment of Legislation) Regulations extended existing regulation to outlaw discrimination when providing goods or services to transsexual people. The definition of "transsexual" used in the Gender Equality Duty is still technically the same as that in the Sexual Discrimination Act; however, this legislation was meant to prevent discrimination against all transgender people.

The Equality Act 2010 officially adds "gender reassignment" as a "protected characteristic", stating: "A person has the protected characteristic of gender reassignment if the person is proposing to undergo, is undergoing or has undergone a process (or part of a process) for the purpose of reassigning the person's sex by changing physiological or other attributes of sex." This law provides protection for transgender people at work, in education, as a consumer, when using public services, when buying or renting property, or as a member or guest of a private club or association. Protection against discrimination by association with a trans person is also included. The Equality Act 2010 prohibits discrimination against people with the protected characteristic of gender reassignment in the provision of separate and single-sex services but includes an exception that service providers can use in exceptional circumstances. In general, organisations that provide separate or single‑sex services for women and men, or provide different services to women and men, are required to treat trans people according to the gender role in which they present.

In limited circumstances, treating trans people differently may be lawful. For example, excluding a trans woman from group support sessions within a sexual abuse crisis centre and instead electing to provide individual support privately, may be justified if their presence is considered detrimental to the support of other service users. This is likely to meet the legal requirements of the exemption in the Equality Act which states that it may be applied as "a proportionate means of achieving a legitimate aim". The exclusion can only be applied on an individual case-by-case basis and must not form part of a blanket policy for the treatment of trans people (Equality Act 2010, Schedule 3, Part 7; Equality Act 2010, Schedule 23).

In 2018, a spokesperson for the Government Equalities Office maintained that the government had no plans to amend the Equality Act 2010 either directly or indirectly, and that it planned to maintain the Equality Act's "provision for single and separate sex spaces".

In addition to the basic legal protection afforded by the Equality Act 2010, the UK government has published good practice guidance on providing services that are inclusive of trans people as customers, clients, users or members.

Some transgender rights activists, such as Transgender Equality & Rights in Scotland, advocate adding the category of "gender identity", "in order to be more clearly inclusive of those transgender people who do not identify as transsexual and do not intend to change the gender in which they live". They also want to introduce measures that would clarify protections from discrimination in education, certain kinds of employment, and medical insurance.

In 2020, the court case Taylor v Jaguar Land Rover Ltd ruled that non-binary gender and genderfluid identities fall under the protected characteristic of gender reassignment in the Equality Act 2010.

In December 2021, the Girls' Day School Trust, the largest network of girls' private school in the UK, issued a blanket ban of trans girls being admitted to any of its schools.

In July 2022, Vice News reported that the Financial Conduct Authority had planned to issue regulations which required the 58,000 businesses under its jurisdiction to allow trans people in their employ to self declare their gender without the need for a gender recognition certificate. Vice reported that after receiving pressure from the Equality and Human Rights Commission, the FCA pivoted to a policy of requiring trans people to be referred to by the sex on their birth certificate, unless they have a gender recognition certificate, which only 1% of trans people in the UK possess. Following corresponding backlash from LGBTQ employees within the FCA, all proposed policy changes were scrapped in their entirety.

Conversion therapy
On 31 March 2022, a Downing Street briefing paper leaked to ITV News showed that the government had planned to drop proposed legislation banning conversion therapy, following an announcement that ministers would explore non-legislative methods of handling the practice. The legislation would have included a ban on conversion therapy for transgender people. Within hours of the leaks, a senior government source stated that the legislation would be introduced in the Queen's Speech in May, and that plans to drop the legislation had been shelved following backlash within the Conservative party and from media outlets. However, in a change from the originally announced plans to ban conversion therapy, the legislation would not criminalise conversion therapy against transgender people.

In response, at least 120 LGBT groups pulled out of the UK's planned first ever Safe To Be Me conference on LGBT issues.

In July 2022, when gay MP Peter Gibson resigned as Parliamentary Private Secretary in the Department for International Trade in protest at Boris Johnson's conduct in the Chris Pincher scandal, his resignation letter expressed disappointment about "the damage our party has inflicted on itself over the failure to include trans people in the ban on conversion therapy". Fellow gay MP and PPS Mike Freer mentioned in his resignation letter that he felt the government was "creating an atmosphere of hostility for LGBT+ people".

Marriage

Corbett v Corbett

The legal case of Corbett v Corbett, heard in November and December 1969 with a February 1971 decision, set a legal precedent regarding the status of transsexual people in the United Kingdom. It was brought at a time when the UK did not recognise mutual consent as reason enough to dissolve a marriage. Arthur Corbett, the plaintiff, sought a method of dissolving his marriage to the model April Ashley, who had brought a petition under the Matrimonial Causes Act 1965 for maintenance. As a result of Justice Ormrod's decision, the marriage was deemed void, and an unofficial correcting of birth certificates for transsexual and intersex people ceased.

In the 1980s and 1990s, the pressure group, Press for Change, campaigned in support for transgender and transsexual people to be allowed to marry, and helped take several cases to the European Court of Human Rights. In Rees v. United Kingdom (1986), the court decided that the UK was not violating any human rights.

Situation since the Gender Recognition Act 2004
Since the Gender Recognition Act 2004, transgender people who are married have been required to divorce or annul their marriage in order for them to be issued with a Gender Recognition Certificate (GRC). The government chose to retain this requirement in the Act as, effectively, it would have legalised a small category of same-sex marriages. The Civil Partnership Act 2004 allowed the creation of civil partnerships between same-sex couples, but a married couple that includes a transgender partner cannot simply re-register their new status. They must first have their marriage dissolved, gain legal recognition of the new gender and then register for a civil partnership. This is like any divorce with the associated paperwork and costs.

With the legalisation of same-sex marriage in England and Wales, existing marriages will continue where one or both parties change their legal gender and both parties wish to remain married. However, civil partnerships continue where only both parties change their gender simultaneously and wish to remain in their civil partnership. This restriction remains as, effectively, it would legalise a small category of opposite-sex civil partnerships. The legislation also does not restore any of the marriages of transgender people that were forcibly annulled as a precondition for them securing a GRC; a GRC will not be issued unless the spouse of the transgender person has consented.

If the spouse does not consent, the marriage must be terminated before a GRC may be issued. Scottish same-sex marriage law does not allow a person to veto their spouse's gender recognition in this manner.

Legality of sex without disclosure of trans status
Under McNally v R, a 2013 legal precedent in England and Wales concerning the case of an underage gender non-conforming person having sex with a cisgender girl, consensual sexual intercourse in which both parties are not aware of each other's trans status or lack thereof can be prosecuted as rape by gender fraud.

In 2016, trans man Kyran Lee was likewise convicted of sexual assault for having consensual sex without disclosing his trans status.

Summary by legal jurisdiction and territory

Public attitudes 

A report on "Attitudes to transgender people" commissioned by the Equality and Human Rights Commission (published in 2020) found that 84% of the British public described themselves as "not prejudiced at all" towards transgender people and 76% believed that prejudice against transgender people was "always or mostly wrong". Stonewall said the "common anti-trans narratives" do not reflect public opinion. A 2020 survey highlighted a generation gap, and found that 56% of Generation Z (ages 18 to 24) believed that transgender rights have not gone far enough, compared to only 20% of baby boomers (ages 55 to 75). Similarly, a YouGov survey found that 57 per cent of women believed that trans people should be able to self-identify as their chosen gender; the survey also found that 70% of Labour voters supported self-identification while only 13% opposed it; furthermore the study found that support for trans rights was most profound in urban areas, with only 14% in London opposed. A study entitled "The 'fault lines' in the UK's culture wars" found that people who opposed trans rights were more likely to rely on incorrect information.

A 2018 survey of 1,000 UK employers found that 33% reported themselves as "less likely" to hire a trans person, and only 9% believed trans people should be protected from employment discrimination.

On 9 July 2022, Vogue reported that over 20,000 people marched in London to support trans rights. On 16 July, PinkNews reported that over 20,000 people marched in Brighton for the same cause.

Christine Burns, author of Trans Britain: Our Journey from the Shadows, stated in a CNN article that The Times and The Sunday Times newspapers published "six trans related pieces in 2016" but "over 150 in 2017 and similarly each year since". In evidence given to the Edinburgh Employment Tribunal in 2019, Burns said that during 2016, both The Times and Sunday Times began to publish a larger number of trans-related stories, and by 2017 had "uniquely" published "over 130" trans-related items, which she described as a "trans backlash" stemming from 2015.

In December 2020, the Independent Press Standards Organisation released a report stating that the average number of UK media stories about trans rights had jumped 414% between May 2014 and May 2019, from 34 per month to 176 per month, and that in the preceding year of research that number had risen to 224 stories per month.

Transphobia and TERF debate
Several commentators have described the level of transphobia in British society in general (including the negative coverage of trans-related issues in the media) and the support for trans-exclusionary radical feminism (TERF) in particular as unusual compared to other Western countries, and the discourse on transgender-related issues in the United Kingdom has been called a "TERF war". Lisa Tilley described the British media as playing a large role in advancing a transphobic agenda to demonise transgender people, and that "the effects are to make the UK one of the most transphobic countries in the world." Drawing on theory of radicalisation, Craig McLean argues that discourse on transgender-related issues in the UK has been radicalised in response to the activities of new lobby groups that push "a radical agenda to deny the basic rights of trans people [...] under the cover of "free speech'". Finn Mackay argued that "during the pandemic, the ceaseless attacks on and lies told about trans people in our media have only increased [...] the fact that our media is awash with conspiracy theories about trans lives [...] should be a national shame." The UK-wide public consultation on reforming the process of obtaining a Gender Recognition Certificate, launched by the government of Theresa May in 2018, has led to a "toxic culture war," according to CNN.

In a report on "hate against LGBTI people in Europe" published in 2021, the Council of Europe criticised "the extensive and often virulent attacks on the rights of LGBTI people for several years" in the United Kingdom along with Hungary, Poland, Russia, and Turkey, and said that these attacks "deliberately mischaracterise the fight for the equality of LGBTI people as so-called 'gender ideology' and seek to stifle the identities and realities of all those who challenge the social constructs that perpetuate gender inequalities and gender-based violence in our societies." ​The report described anti-trans rhetoric in the United Kingdom as having gained "baseless and concerning credibility, at the expense of both trans people's civil liberties and women's and children's rights", citing an increase in anti-trans hate crimes since 2015 and statements made at the 2021 IDAHOT forum by Minister of Equalities, Kemi Badenoch. The report also highlighted anti-LGBT+ hate speech on social media.

This state of affairs has led to the moniker "TERF Island" being used in some circles to refer to the UK.

At several British universities student bodies have sought to ban trans-exclusionary radical feminists from appearing as speakers. In 2015 the University of Manchester Students' Union banned Julie Bindel from speaking at the university over concerns that her views would "incite hatred." In 2018 the University of Bristol Students' Union (Bristol SU) adopted a motion that banned trans-exclusionary radical feminists (TERFs) from appearing as speakers at Bristol SU events and that called upon the university to adopt the same policy. The motion said the TERF ban was necessary because TERF activity on the university campus "put[s] trans students' safety at risk [...] in direct violation of the aims outlined in the Code of Conduct."

In October 2021, CNN published an article that accused UK media promoting anti-transgender views. The Article accused the BBC, Sky News, and GB News, for pushing transphobia and using slurs against transgender people. In an interview in the article, political economist from the university of London, Lisa Tilley said "The media shamefully advances this transphobic frontier, with both the right-wing press and ostensibly leftist outlets."

In November 2021, the physician and LGBT+ rights activist Adrian Harrop was forced to attend a tribunal held by the Department of Health's Medical Practitioners Tribunal Service to determine his fitness to continue practising medicine, after he made several tweets in support of trans rights. Vice News reported that "One of the tweets deemed 'highly offensive' by the tribunal involved Harrop calling a woman who vocally opposes trans rights 'a venomous transphobic bigot', whose aim was to 'demonise trans people' while 'excluding them from public life'." The MPTS ultimately handed down a one-month suspension for Harrop's tweets, stating in its ruling that "Harrop's actions in posting inappropriate tweets over a sustained period of time, in contradiction to the advice he was given, breached fundamental tenets of the profession. His actions brought the profession into disrepute, undermining public confidence in the profession and the standards of conduct expected from members of the profession."

In June 2022, it was announced that Stephanie Davies-Arai, founder of the group Transgender Trend, which advocates against access to gender affirming healthcare for transgender youth, would receive the British Empire Medal from Queen Elizabeth II.

A June 2022 YouGov poll found "an overall gradual erosion in support towards transgender rights". In 2018, 43% of Brits surveyed agreed that trans women are women, compared to 38% in 2022. 61% of Brits surveyed stated they were against trans women in women's sports, compared to 48% in 2018. Likewise, the number of people believing there is no risk to allowing trans women to use women's facilities fell from 43% to 32%. The number of people who believed a doctor's permission should not be required to change their gender on government documents fell from 65% to 60%. Sasha Misra, Associate Director of Communications for Stonewall, stated in response that "a dip in public support on some trans issues is only to be expected, given the excessive and incendiary level of coverage we have seen in the media over the last few years". The poll also found only 38% of Brits surveyed were in favor of the NHS providing gender affirming care.

In July 2022, PinkNews reported that MP Joanna Cherry had been elected chair of the Joint Committee on Human Rights. PinkNews reported that Cherry supports the LGB Alliance (created in opposition to Stonewall after they began to campaign for transgender equality). Professor Stephen Whittle OBE of Manchester Metropolitan University was quoted describing Cherry as having "antagonism to trans people's privacy rights as clarified by the European Courts", and characterised the development as "an incalculable loss to justice and parliament's role in protecting the UK's minorities".

In August 2022, Attorney General Suella Braverman opined that it is lawful for schools to misgender, deadname, ban from some sports, reject from enrollment based on their trans status, and refuse any and all other forms of gender affirmation to trans kids, and that to recognise their identities as trans would qualify as "indoctrinating children".

In October 2022, the Home Office reported that between 2021 and 2022, hate crimes against trans people increased by 56%, which it linked to growing hostility on social media.

BBC coverage

The BBC, the United Kingdom's public broadcaster, has frequently drawn criticism from both pro-transgender activist groups and British politicians for its reporting on and policies towards trans issues. In December 2020, the head of the UK media regulator Ofcom issued a condemnation the BBC for balancing appearances by transgender people with activists from gender critical groups, calling it "extremely inappropriate".

In October 2021, the BBC published the article 'We're being pressured into sex by some trans women', written by Caroline Lowbridge. It was produced by BBC Nottingham, a branch of BBC English Regions. The article claims that lesbians are being pressured by transgender women into having sex with them. The article received widespread criticism among the LGBT community as transphobic. It drew particular attention for the inclusion of comments from former American female pornographic actress Lily Cade, who wrote a blog post after the article's publication calling for the "lynching" of trans women. Cade's comments were subsequently removed from the article.

Trans Activism UK, Trans Media Watch and Mermaids were critical of the article; an open letter with 20,000 signatories asked for the BBC to apologise. The Guardian and The Times reported that the article was met with backlash by BBC staff, including prior to its publication, while protests took place outside BBC offices. Criticisms centred on the inclusion of a Twitter poll from the anti-transgender group Get the L Out that reported 56% of 80 self-selected lesbians had been pressured into sex by transgender women. Critics also believed that Lowbridge's chosen interviewees had a narrow range of viewpoints. A Stonewall executive is quoted on the subject, as is the co-founder of the LGB Alliance, which was created in opposition to Stonewall after they began to campaign for transgender equality.

In November 2021, the BBC announced it was pulling out of Stonewall's diversity scheme, citing a need to remain impartial.

Equality And Human Rights Commission

The Equality and Human Rights Commission (EHRC) is a non-departmental public body in England and Wales, established by the Equality Act 2006 with effect from 1 October 2007. The commission has responsibility for the promotion and enforcement of equality and non-discrimination laws in England, Scotland and Wales. It took over the responsibilities of the Commission for Racial Equality, the Equal Opportunities Commission and the Disability Rights Commission. The EHRC also has responsibility for other aspects of equality law: age, sexual orientation and religion or belief. A national human rights institution, it seeks to promote and protect human rights in England and Wales.

In April 2021, the EHRC submitted evidence backing Maya Forstater in Forstater v Center for Global Development Europe, wherein Forstater sued her employer, the Center for Global Development Europe, for not having her employment contract renewed after expressing gender critical beliefs. PinkNews reported that the EHRC issued a statement saying "We think that a 'gender critical' belief that 'trans women are men and trans men are women' is a philosophical belief which is protected under the Equality Act".

In May 2021, the EHRC withdrew itself from Stonewall's diversity champions scheme.

In December 2021, gender critical lawyer Akua Reindorf was named the commissioner of the EHRC, along with receiving a seat as a board member, by Liz Truss.

In January 2022, the EHRC released dual statements opposing the removal of administrative barriers for trans people to receive legal recognition in Scotland, and asking that England and Wales' ban on conversion therapy not include trans people.

In February 2022, Vice News reported that it had been leaked sections of an unpublished EHRC guidance pack dating to late 2021, which advised businesses and organisations to exclude transgender people from single-sex spaces - including toilets, hospital wards, and changing rooms - unless they held a Gender Recognition Certificate (GRC). Vice reported that the guidance, which had been due to be released in January 2022, but had not been published , was aimed at "[protecting] women", and that just 1% of trans people in the UK held a GRC.

Grooming conspiracy theory

In 2020, anti-transgender activist Graham Linehan was banned from Twitter after beginning to use "OK groomer" as an attack against those who criticised his activism. The term was also picked by pressure group Transgender Trend, which used in material that it sent to schools to oppose advice given by LGBT+ charities such as Stonewall. In March 2020, The Times columnist Janice Turner accused the charity Mermaids, which offers support for trans youth, of grooming for introducing an exit button on their website in response to the COVID-19 pandemic lockdown. The conspiracy has also been used by the far-right in the UK, including Tommy Robinson.

Scotland

In March 2022, a bill was formally introduced in the Scottish Parliament which would reform the Gender Recognition Act implemented by the Parliament of the United Kingdom in 2004. If enacted, this bill would make it easier for trans people in Scotland to change their legally recognised gender by changing the process of applying for a Gender Recognition Certificate. Under the changes, applicants would no longer need to prove having lived for two years in their acquired gender or obtain a gender dysphoria diagnosis. Instead, they would be required to swear under oath that they intend to remain permanently in their acquired gender. In addition, applications would be handled by the Registrar General for Scotland, instead of a UK-wide gender recognition panel. The UK Government ruled out implementing similar changes in England and Wales.

In December 2022 the Gender Recognition Reform (Scotland) Bill was passed by the Scottish Parliament by a vote of 86-39 and is awaiting royal assent. In response, Prime Minister Rishi Sunak suggested that the UK would, for the first time in its history, invoke Section 35 of the Scotland Act 1998 to veto the law, over concerns for "women’s and children’s safety". 

On 9 January 2023, Equalities Minister Kemi Badenoch, stated that gender recognition certificates, and associated government documents granted to trans people in Scotland, would no longer be recognised in England and Wales, and that the British government would review the gender recognition processes of other countries to determine whether or not to implement similar policies regarding their documents. Critics described this action as a "trans travel ban", with some quoted as saying "the UK government sees trans people as a threat to be contained, not citizens to be respected". A Cabinet Office spokesperson responded by saying that trans people "have not and will not be banned" from entering the UK.

On 16 January 2023, the UK Government invoked Section 35 of the Scotland Act for the first time and blocked the new law from taking effect, an action that raised questions regarding Scottish devolution. Although the UK's Scottish Secretary, Alister Jack, said they still respect Scottish devolution, the Scottish National Party described the decision to block as "an unprecedented attack" on Scottish self-governance, with party leader and First Minister Nicola Sturgeon saying they would "vigorously defend this legislation" in court.

In early 2023, it was announced that the Scottish government would house trans prisoners based on their gender assigned at birth.

See also
History of transgender people in the United Kingdom
Transgender rights
LGBT+ Liberal Democrats
Labour Campaign for Trans Rights
Intersex rights in the United Kingdom

References

External links
Gender Recognition Certificate

Human rights in the United Kingdom
LGBT rights in the United Kingdom
Transgender in the United Kingdom
Transgender law in the United Kingdom
United Kingdom
United Kingdom tribunals
Gender in the United Kingdom
Discrimination in the United Kingdom
Healthcare in the United Kingdom